Netcom may refer to:

Army Network Enterprise Technology Command (NETCOM), a Signal command in the U.S. Army Cyber Command
China Netcom, telecom company in mainland China
NetCom (Norway), Telia Norge, Norwegian mobile phone operator 
Netcom (United States), an American Internet service provider
Netcom (Mongolia), a backbone network owner and wholesale internet provider in Mongolia